Soviet jewelry (soviet jewellery) is primarily gold, silver, platinum and palladium jewelry produced in The Union of Soviet Socialist Republics (USSR) between 1922 and 1991.

Soviet gold jewelry 

Gold jewelry was the most popular jewelry in the USSR. It was produced in lesser numbers than silver jewelry, yet it was the most desired metal by the Soviet public. The overwhelming majority of soviet gold jewelry was of rose or red 14 karat gold (583 millesimal fineness). Although gold of other, higher and lower purity, as well as different colors was used in the soviet jewelry production, the 583 millesimal fineness became the most popular choice, by far.

Soviet silver jewelry 

Soviet silver jewelry was the most produced fine jewelry in the USSR. The most common millesimal fineness for silver jewelry became "875"..

Soviet platinum and palladium jewelry 

Soviet platinum and palladium jewelry was not very common in USSR. These metals were reserved for recognized jewelry artists, jewelry intended for export or for limited production jewelry. To date very few of these items survived.

Classification 

Soviet jewelry falls under the category of art, antiques and collectibles which are all grouped and defined as Movable Cultural Property. Although all Soviet jewelry can be called art, most of jewelry from USSR is considered to be collectibles and some, depending on the jurisdiction under which they are located, are (or soon to become) legitimate antiques .

References 

 Soviet Jewelers - Works by Masters of Soviet Republics 1960s-1970s, Sovetsky Hudozhnik Publishers, 1980, Moscow, 460 p., Б3-16-50-80
 Каталог 1 - Товары народного потребления - Ювелирные изделия - Изделия из золота, изд.: ЦНИИТЭИприборостроения, 1985, Москва,160 ст.    
 Каталог 2 - Товары народного потребления - Ювелирные изделия - Изделия из серебра, изд.: ЦНИИТЭИприборостроения, 1985, Москва,64 ст.
 Справочник - Клейма на изделиях из драгоценных металлов 1917-2000гг (СССР-Россия), Н. Г. Троепольская, Collectors Books, 2000, Moscow, 720 p., 
 Советские ювелирные изделия - 3 книги в 1, Тамойкин Д., 2013, Канада, 449 ст., ил.   
 Ювелирные изделия и часы, В. А. Селиванкин, С. В. Тарасов, Госторгиздат, 1960, Москва, 224 ст. ил.
 Ювелирные товары и часы - Товароведение, В. Д. Логинов, ПТУ / Государственная торговля, Экономика, 1989, Москва, 208 ст. ил.

J01
Jewellery
Antiques
Economy of the Soviet Union